Lough Tay (Irish: Loch Té), is a small but scenic lake set on private property in the Wicklow Mountains in Ireland. The lake lies between the mountains of Djouce , and Luggala , and is dominated by Luggala's east-facing granite cliffs. The lough is fed by the Cloghoge River, which then drains into Lough Dan to the south. Lough Tay forms part of the Guinness Estate at Luggala, and has limited public access.

Naming
The English name derives from the Irish name, Loch Té, meaning 'tea lake', because of its similarity to strong Irish tea. The nickname, 'The Guinness Lake' name comes from the former owners of the land. The lake is part of the former Guinness estate, owned by Arthur Guinness. Another claimed reason for it to be called the "Guinness Lake" is that the Guinness family imported white sand and laid it over a beach on the northern shore of the lake to make it look like a pint of Guinness.

Scenic viewpoint
The view into Lough Tay (with the cliffs of Luggala behind) is a popular scenic viewpoint in Wicklow and is easily viewed from one of the several car-parks along the R759 road (e.g. Ballinastoe Wood, and the J.B. Malone car-parks).  A short hike up the first boardwalked section of the path to the summit of Djouce mountain, to the J.B. Malone memorial stone (part of the 131-kilometre Wicklow Way trail), is another popular scenic viewpoint of the lough.

Culture

Bertrand Russell
The philosopher Bertrand Russell said that when he was young he twice visited Ireland with his Aunt Agatha he visited Lough Tay. He visited on his own and with Michael Davitt and he said that the beautiful scenery made a profound impression on him and highlighted the small lake at Lugala. He returned half a century later with his friend Crompton Davies and they revisited Lugala but they looked over it from a wood set above the lake rather than the pebbly shore Russell remembered. This experience convinced Russell that one should not try and renew old memories.

Vikings
Lough Tay is the setting for the fictional village of Kattegat in the 2013 television historical drama series Vikings.

Other film usage
Lough Tay features prominently in other films including the 1974 film Zardoz and 1981 film Excalibur by John Boorman.

Gallery

See also

List of loughs of Ireland
Wicklow Way
Wicklow Mountains
Lists of mountains in Ireland

References

Lakes of County Wicklow